Lyle Lovett is Lyle Lovett's 1986 debut album.  By the mid-1980s, Lovett had already distinguished himself in the burgeoning Texas singer-songwriter scene.  He had performed in the New Folk competition at the Kerrville Folk Festival in 1980 and returned to win in 1982. In 1984, he recorded a four-song demo with the help of the Phoenix band J. David Sloan and the Rogues and his music had begun to be distributed by the Fast Folk Musical Magazine

Nanci Griffith had recorded Lovett's "If I Were the Man You Wanted" as "If I Were the Woman You Wanted" for her 1984 album, Once in a Very Blue Moon. He appears on that album as a vocalist and also can be seen in the picture on the cover of her subsequent album Last of the True Believers (1986).

Chart performance
Lovett's debut reached number 14 on Billboard's chart for Top Country Albums.

Critical reception 
Lyle Lovett was ranked No. 91 in Rolling Stone's 100 Best Albums of the 1980s, and both Velvet and the Italian magazine Il Mucchio Selvaggio also cited it as one of the top 100 albums of the decade. Allmusic compares the album to Steve Earle's Guitar Town, calling it, "one of the most promising and exciting debut albums to come out of Nashville in the 1980s." Robert Christgau described Lovett's debut as: "Writes like Guy Clark, only plainer, sings like Jesse Winchester only countrier."

Track listing 
All songs by Lyle Lovett, except "This Old Porch" by Lyle Lovett and Robert Earl Keen.
 "Cowboy Man" – 2:48 
 "God Will" – 2:13 
 "Farther Down the Line" – 3:05 
 "This Old Porch" – 4:16 
 "Why I Don't Know" – 2:41 
 "If I Were the Man You Wanted" – 3:57 
 "You Can't Resist It" – 3:08 
 "The Waltzing Fool" – 3:49 
 "An Acceptable Level of Ecstasy (The Wedding Song)" – 3:30 
 "Closing Time" – 3:43

Personnel

Musicians 
 Lyle Lovett – vocals, acoustic guitar; background vocals ("You Can't Resist It")
 Ray Herndon – electric rhythm guitar, background vocals; electric lead guitar ("Farther Down the Line" and "Why I Don't Know")
 Tom Mortensen – steel guitar
 Billy Williams – electric lead guitar; saxophone arrangements
 Vince Gill – electric rhythm guitar ("You Can't Resist It")
 Jon Goin – electric rhythm and lead guitars ("You Can't Resist It")
 Mac McAnally – acoustic lead guitar ("God Will", "Farther Down the Line" and "If I Were the Man You Wanted")
 Mathew McKenzie – bass
 Emory Gordy Jr. – bass ("Farther Down the Line")
 Mark Prentice – organ; piano ("God Will" and "Farther Down the Line")
 Matt Rollings – acoustic and electric piano
 John Jarvis – synthesizer ("You Can't Resist It")
 Jeff Borree – drums
 Bob Warren – drums ("Farther Down the Line", "This Old Porch" and "An Acceptable Level of Ecstasy")
 James Gilmer – congas
 Glen Duncan – fiddle
 Steve Marsh – saxophones
 J. David Sloan – background vocals
 Rosanne Cash – background vocals ("You Can't Resist It")
 Francine Reed – background vocals ("An Acceptable Level of Ecstasy")

Production 
 Producers – Tony Brown and Lyle Lovett
 Associate Producer – Billy Williams
 Recorded at Chaton Recordings, Scottsdale, Arizona
 Engineer – Steven Moore
 Second Engineer – Andy Seagle
 Overdubs and Remix at Treasure Isle Recorders, Nashville, Tennessee
 Remixed – Gene Eichelberger
 Second Engineers – Tom Der and Tom Harding
 Mastered at Mastertonics using the JVC Audio Digital Mastering System
 Mastering – Glen Meadows
 Digital editing – Milan Bogdan
 Compact Disc master tap prepared by Glen Meadows and Milan Bogdan

Artwork 
 Simon Levy – art direction
 Peter Nash – photography
 Mickey Braithwaite – design
 Kate Gillon & Sherri Halford – CD coordination
 Guy Clark – liner notes

References

1986 debut albums
Lyle Lovett albums
Albums produced by Tony Brown (record producer)
Curb Records albums
MCA Records albums